Happy, Horny, Gay and Sassy is a live E.P. released by Screeching Weasel in 1992 on 7-inch vinyl.  All songs were recorded live in the WFMU Studios by Dave Parasite on January 2, 1992, and broadcast live over WFMU Radio in East Orange, New Jersey .  This limited edition pressing of 300 copies was a re-release of the E.P. Snappy Answers To Stupid Questions adding a second single-sided record with 3 additional songs recorded at the same session.  This is the only officially released Screeching Weasel recording which has not been made available on CD as part of a compilation.  It is also the band's only release to feature Gub (Scott Conway) on bass guitar.

Track listing
All songs written by Ben Weasel except when noted.
Record 1
Side A
My Right
The Science Of Myth
Side B
Jeannie's Got A Problem With Her Uterus
I Was A High School Psychopath (Danny Vapid)
Danny Is A Wimp (Joe King)

Record 2
Side A
My Brain Hurts
I Wanna Be A Homosexual (Ben Weasel/Danny Vapid/Jughead)
Don't Turn Out The Lights

Personnel
Ben Weasel- vocals
Jughead- guitar
Danny Vapid- guitar, backing vocals
Gub -bass
Dan Panic -drums

1992 EPs
Screeching Weasel EPs